Gilbert Martin ("Gilly") Reay (24 January 1887 – 31 January 1967) was an English first-class cricketer active 1913–23 who played for Surrey. He was born in Wallington, and died in Croydon. He played 29 matches as an amateur either side of World War I. His best season in first class cricket came in 1920, when he took 42 wickets at an average of 18.71. He appeared in the Gentlemen v Players match of 1923. 

1887 births
1967 deaths
English cricketers
Surrey cricketers
Gentlemen cricketers